Zeuxidia is a genus of very large butterflies in the family Nymphalidae. They are "leaf" butterflies with a cryptic ventral pattern. The genus is Indomalayan (Burma through Indochina and the Philippines to Sumatra, Java and Borneo.

Species
In alphabetical order:
Zeuxidia amethystus Butler, 1865 - Saturn
Zeuxidia aurelius (Cramer, 1777) - giant Saturn
Zeuxidia dohrni Fruhstorfer, 1893
Zeuxidia doubledayi Westwood, 1851
Zeuxidia luxerii Hübner, 1826
Zeuxidia masoni Moore, 1879
Zeuxidia mesilauensis Barlow, Banks & Holloway, 1971
Zeuxidia semperi Felder & Felder, 1861
Zeuxidia sibulana Honrath, 1885

References

External links
Images representing Zeuxidia at EOL

 
Nymphalidae genera
Taxa named by Jacob Hübner
Amathusiini